Bretteville-sur-Laize is a commune in the Calvados department in the Normandy region in northwestern France.

The scene of heavy fighting following the Normandy landings, much of the town is of post-World War II construction.

Population

International relations
Bretteville-sur-Laize is twinned with:
  Maßbach, Germany (since 1989)
  Chagford, England (since 1975, but twinning activity lapsed in the 1990s)

See also
 Communes of the Calvados department
 Bretteville-sur-Laize Canadian War Cemetery
 Château des Riffets

References

Communes of Calvados (department)
Calvados communes articles needing translation from French Wikipedia